Zinc finger MIZ domain-containing protein 1 is a protein that in humans is encoded by the ZMIZ1 gene.

Interactions 
ZMIZ1 has been shown to interact with Androgen receptor.

References

Further reading

External links